Iqbal Khan may refer to:

 Iqbal Khan (general), Pakistani military officer 
 Iqbal Khan (lawyer), Indo-Fijian lawyer
 Iqbal Khan (banker) (born 1957), Indian banker in the UK
 Iqbal Ahmad Khan, Indian classical vocalist
 Iqbal Muhammad Ali Khan (born 1958), Pakistani politician
 Amir Iqbal Khan (born 1986), British boxer
 Malik Iqbal Mehdi Khan (1952–2016), Pakistani politician
 Mohammad Iqbal Khan (born 1981), Indian actor
 Mohammad Nafees Iqbal Khan (born 1985), Bangladeshi cricketer
 Rana Iqbal Ahmad Khan, Pakistani lawyer and politician
 Rana Muhammad Iqbal Khan (politician), Pakistani politician
 Sania Iqbal Khan (born 1985), Pakistani cricketer
 Tamim Iqbal Khan (born 1989), Bangladeshi cricketer
Suzad Iqbal Khan (born 1989), Indian BollyWood Director

See also
 Iqbal Hussain Khan Bandanawazi (1942–2010), Indian Sufi musician 
 Iqbal Khan Jadoon (1931–1977), Pakistani politician